Marie-Hélène Lentini is a French actress and comedian.

Theater

Filmography

References

External links
 

French film actresses
Living people
21st-century French actresses
Actresses from Paris
20th-century French actresses
French stage actresses
French television actresses
Year of birth missing (living people)